Raisio Oyj, known internationally as Raisio Group, is a Finnish company specialised in healthy, responsibly produced food and ingredients. 

Raisio Group's well-known international brands are Benecol and Elovena.

Benecol foods were launched in Finland in 1995 as part of major public health initiative to lower the nation's cholesterol. Two decades later Benecol product range has grown to include spreads, yogurts and yogurt drinks trusted by millions around the world.

In 2021, the Group's net sales totalled EUR 246 million and comparable EBIT was EUR 22 million. Raisio employs some 400 persons. Raisio's production plants are located in Finland and the company has operations in ten countries. The Group’s headquarters is in Raisio, Western Finland. The key markets of Benecol products are Finland, the UK, Poland, Ireland and Belgium.

In 2004, the company divested its paper chemical division, Raisio Chemicals, to Ciba Specialty Chemicals. In 2009, Raisio sold its margarine business to Bunge Limited. Raisio Group acquired the British food company Glisten in 2010. The next year, Raisio acquired Big Bear. In November 2014 Raisio acquired the Benecol business from the affiliates of Johnson & Johnson in the UK, Ireland and Belgium and amended the agreement on the Northern American markets of Benecol. In 2016 Raisio divested its snack bar business in the UK.

The main target for 2007 was to improve profitability through streamlining, focusing and enhancing operations. Hereby Raisio divested its food potato and diagnostics businesses and carried through several minor structural changes. Raisio and its partner McNeil signed an agreement that returned Benecol rights to Raisio. The company divested its confectionery business in the end of 2017 and the cattle feed business in 2018. The strategy 2022–2025 has a clear focus on healthy, responsibly produced food. In 2021, Raisio acquired the Finnish company Verso Food Oy and published a new strategy for 2022–2025. The strategy is based on three focus areas: Benecol products and plant stanol ester solutions, oat-based consumer products and oats as an industrial raw material, and plant-based food.

References

External links 

Companies listed on Nasdaq Helsinki
Food and drink companies of Finland
Food and drink companies established in 1939
1939 establishments in Finland